Long-chain-fatty-acid—CoA ligase 5 is an enzyme that in humans is encoded by the ACSL5 gene.

The protein encoded by this gene is an isozyme of the long-chain fatty-acid-coenzyme A ligase family. Although differing in substrate specificity, subcellular localization, and tissue distribution, all isozymes of this family convert free long-chain fatty acids into fatty acyl-CoA esters, and thereby play a key role in lipid biosynthesis and fatty acid degradation. This isozyme is highly expressed in uterus and spleen, and in trace amounts in normal brain, but has markedly increased levels in malignant gliomas. This gene functions in mediating fatty acid-induced glioma cell growth. Three transcript variants encoding two different isoforms have been found for this gene.

References

External links

Further reading

Human proteins